The Apostolic Vicariate (Vicariate Apostolic) of Napo is a missionary circonscription (quasi-diocese) of the Roman Catholic Church. Its cathedral see, Catedral San José, is located in the city of Tena, capital of Napo Province in Ecuador's Amazon Rainforest.

History 
On 7 February 1871, Pope Pius IX established the Vicariate Apostolic of Napo from the Archdiocese of Quito. It remains exempt, i.e. directly subject to the Holy See, not part of any ecclesiastical province.

It has lost territory five times with the creation of the following jurisdictions within Ecuador: 
 Apostolic Prefecture of Canelos e Macas (1886; meanwhile a Vicariate Apostolic)
 Apostolic Vicariate of Méndez (1893, as Méndez y Gualaquiza)
 Vicariate Apostolic of Zamora (1893)
 Apostolic Prefecture of San Miguel de Sucumbíos (1924; meanwhile an Apostolic Vicariate) 
 Apostolic Prefecture of Aguarico (1953; meanwhile an Apostolic Vicariate).

Bishops

Episcopal incumbents 
''So far, all its Ordinaries have been members of the missionary Congregation of Saint Joseph (C.S.I.)
 Emilio Cecco, C.S.I. † (28 April 1931 – 1938)
 Giorgio Rossi, C.S.I. † (23 May 1938 – 22 Jan. 1941)
 Maximiliano Spiller, C.S.I. † (12 Nov. 1941 – 27 April 1978)
 Julio Parise Loro, C.S.I. † (27 April 1978 – 2 Aug. 1996)
 Paolo Mietto, C.S.I. †(2 Aug. 1996 – 11 June 2010)
 Celmo Lazzari, C.S.I. (11 June 2010 – 21 Nov. 2013), appointed Vicar Apostolic of San Miguel de Sucumbíos
Adelio Pasqualotto, C.S.I. (12 Dec 2014–present)

Coadjutor Vicar Apostolic
Paolo Mietto, C.S.I. †(1 July 1994 - 2 Aug. 1996)

Auxiliary bishops
Antonio Cabri, C.S.I. † (9 May 1974 to 27 July 1974), died without being consecrated
Julio Parise Loro, C.S.I. † (5 Oct. 1974 - 27 April 1978), appointed Vicar Apostolic here

See also 
 Roman Catholicism in Ecuador

Sources and References 

Apostolic vicariates
Roman Catholic dioceses in Ecuador
Religious organizations established in 1871
1871 establishments in South America